Dargeia is a genus of moths in the family Geometridae erected by Claude Herbulot in 1977.

References

Geometrinae